Kimweri may refer to:
Omari Kimweri (born 22 September 1982), an Australian boxer, born in Tanzania 
Kimweri ye Nyumbai (died 1862), the ruler of the Shambaa people of the Usambara Mountains in what is now Tanzania between around 1815 and 1862
Kimweri Mputa Magogo (died 1999), a traditional leader of the Shambaa people of the Usambara Mountains in Tanzania